Jefferson Hall is a historic home located in Greene County, Georgia, just east of the city of Union Point, at 6041 Union Point Highway (a road also known as Georgia 12 and US Highway 278). Since 1989 the property has been listed on the National Register of Historic Places. The house is easily visible from the road, but is currently in private hands and is not open or accessible to the public.

Built in 1818 or 1830 (county and historical records differ on this point), Jefferson Hall is an example of Greek Revival architecture.

References

Houses on the National Register of Historic Places in Georgia (U.S. state)
Houses in Greene County, Georgia
Houses completed in 1818
Greek Revival architecture in Georgia (U.S. state)
National Register of Historic Places in Greene County, Georgia